ITV News West Country is a British television news service broadcast and produced by ITV West Country.

Overview

ITV News West Country 
is broadcast from studios in Brislington, Bristol, with district reporters and camera crews based in newsrooms at Plymouth, Exeter, Truro, Taunton, Swindon and Gloucester.

History
The nightly regional news programme was launched on 16 February 2009 as The West Country Tonight, following the merger of two regional news services – The West Tonight (ITV West) and Westcountry Live (ITV Westcountry).

From 24 November 2016, ITV News West Country began broadcasting in HD to the ITV West and ITV Westcountry regions on Sky and Freesat only. At present, Freeview and Virgin Media carry the ITV News Central region on ITV HD in the West and Westcountry, requiring these viewers to use the standard definition ITV channel for their regional ITV News West Country service.

On air staff
When the programme launched, it was presented by ITV West presenters Lisa Aziz and Steve Scott (formerly of The West Tonight). ITV West weather presenters Alex Beresford and Bob Crampton were both retained. Beresford left the programme in a full time capacity to present the weather for Good Morning Britain in 2017; Crampton remained in his role until his retirement in 2018.

However, Aziz was suspended in June 2009 from her position and left ITV in February 2010, with former Westcountry Live freelancer Vanessa Cuddeford taking over. Scott left his position to become sports editor for ITV News in May 2010, and was replaced by former Meridian Tonight presenter Ian Axton.

Bristol-based district correspondent Cordelia Lynch became a stand-in main presenter for Cuddeford from May 2012 when she went on maternity leave. Both Cuddeford and Lynch announced their departures from ITV West Country a year later. Kylie Pentelow of BBC East Midlands Today replaced Cuddeford from July 2013.

On 3 March 2017, it was announced that former Sky News presenter Mark Longhurst would be taking over from Ian Axton, following his promotion to Head of News for ITV West Country in January 2017. Longhurst left the programme seven months later.

On 22 January 2018, it was announced that interim presenter Jonty Messer had become Longhurst's replacement.

Kylie Pentelow moved to Wales at Six on 4 February 2019, for a one-year secondment.

Eli-Louise Wringe is maternity leave cover for Pentelow from April 2022.

Messer left ITV on 27 July. Sabet Choudhury succeeds Messer from 17 October 2022.

Notable on air staff include Ben McGrail (Somerset correspondent).

Notable former on air staff include Lisa Aziz, Alex Beresford, Bob Crampton, Mark Longhurst, Jonty Messer, Peter Rowell and Steve Scott.

Sub-regional service
As part of the pan-regional launch of what was initially called The Westcountry Tonight in February 2009, two opt-out services were retained, incorporating the first half of the main evening programme on weeknights at 6pm, the full late bulletins after News at Ten on weeknights, and sports news on Mondays and Fridays. The opt-outs were known as East and West at first, then changed to more geographically accurate names. ITV News West Country (South West) covers Cornwall, Devon, parts of Dorset and parts of Somerset, while  ITV News West Country (West) covers Bristol, parts of Dorset, Gloucestershire, Somerset and Wiltshire.

On 5 September 2011, separate weekday daytime bulletins for the two sub-regions (at breakfast and lunchtime) were reintroduced.

In July 2013, proposals for a more localised Channel 3 news service were approved. ITV News West Country extended the East (now West) and West (now South West) opt-out services to at least 20 minutes of the 6pm programme, in addition to separate weekend bulletins for the two sub-regions, effectively restoring full services for the two areas. The changes came into effect from 16 September 2013. Both sub-regional services utilise the same presenter(s) and studio/set in Bristol, therefore one of the two opt-outs – depending on the day's news – is pre-recorded 'as live' shortly before transmission.

References

External links

2009 British television series debuts
2010s British television series
2020s British television series
ITV regional news shows
Mass media in Bristol
Television news in England